Ahmed Al-Nahwi (Arabic: أحمد النحوي) (born 11 May 1991) is a Qatari footballer who plays as a defender. He played in the Qatar Stars League for Al Arabi, Umm Salal, Al-Khor and Al-Shahania.

External links
 

Qatari footballers
1991 births
Living people
Al-Arabi SC (Qatar) players
Umm Salal SC players
El Jaish SC players
Al-Khor SC players
Al-Shahania SC players
Mesaimeer SC players
Qatar Stars League players
Qatari Second Division players
Association football defenders